Wang Lili is a Chinese paralympic rower. She won the silver medal at the Women's single sculls event at the 2016 Summer Paralympics with 5:16.65.

References

Living people
Rowers at the 2016 Summer Paralympics
Medalists at the 2016 Summer Paralympics
Paralympic silver medalists for China
Paralympic rowers of China
Chinese female rowers
Year of birth missing (living people)
Paralympic medalists in rowing
21st-century Chinese people